Senator Sprague may refer to:

Members of the United States Senate
Peleg Sprague (Maine politician) (1793–1880), U.S. Senator from Maine from 1829 to 1835
William Sprague III (1799–1856), U.S. Senator from Rhode Island from 1842 to 1844
William Sprague IV (1830–1915), U.S. Senator from Rhode Island from 1863 to 1875

United States state senate members
Charles F. Sprague (1857–1902), Massachusetts State Senate 
E. Carleton Sprague (1822–1895), New York State Senate 
Frederick Sprague (fl. 1840s–1850s), Wisconsin State Senate
Henry H. Sprague (1841–1920), Massachusetts State Senate
Jo Ann Sprague (born 1931), Massachusetts State Senate
Royal Sprague (1814–1872), California State Senate
William P. Sprague (1827–1899), Ohio State Senate